Lestes inaequalis is a species of damselfly in the family Lestidae, the spreadwings. This species is known commonly as the elegant spreadwing. It is native to eastern North America, including eastern Canada and the United States.

Description
This species is 45 to 60 millimeters long. The male has a metallic green and yellow thorax and a blue-tipped green abdomen. The body is pruinose, especially in older specimens. The female has a thicker body with duller coloration. This species is similar to the swamp spreadwing (L. vigilax) but larger in size, and to the amber-winged spreadwing (L. eurinus) but without the amber wings.

Biology
This species lives near freshwater bodies such as streams, lakes, ponds, and marshes. It may live under the canopy in wooded areas.

The elegant spreadwing is known to feed on smaller damselflies.

References

Lestes
Odonata of North America
Insects of Canada
Insects of the United States
Fauna of the Eastern United States
Insects described in 1862